The Ulster Junior Hurling Championship is a junior "knockout" competition in the game of Hurling played in the province of Ulster in Ireland. The series of games are organised by the Ulster Council.

The winners of the Ulster Junior Hurling Championship each year progress to play the other provincial champions for a chance to win the All-Ireland Junior Hurling Championship. The competition has not been played since 2004, as all the counties now participate in either the Joe McDonagh Cup, Christy Ring Cup, Nicky Rackard Cup or Lory Meagher Cup

Top winners

Roll of honour

 1970 No record of a championship. Ulster were not represented in the All-Ireland semi-finals.
 1971 Played on a league basis – Monaghan were the winners
 1955 Unfinished – Refixed

See also
Munster Junior Hurling Championship
Leinster Junior Hurling Championship
Connacht Junior Hurling Championship

References

Sources
 Roll of Honour on gaainfo.com
 Complete Roll of Honour on Kilkenny GAA bible

3